R. Laxminarayanappa Jalappa (19 October 1925 – 17 December 2021) was an Indian politician who was the leader of the Indian National Congress (INC) from the State of Karnataka.

Jalappa was a member of the INC till 1979 when he quit the party to form the Karnataka Kranti Ranga with D. Devaraj Urs, which merged with the Janata Party the following year. Ten years later, he joined the Janata Dal and was elected to the Lok Sabha, the lower House of the Indian Parliament, in 1996, from Chikballapur. He served as the Union Minister of Textiles from 1996 to January 1998, when he quit the party and resigned as minister to rejoin the INC. He was elected to the Lok Sabha again, a member of which he remained till 2009. He also served as the chairman of the Sri Devaraj Urs Medical College situated in Kolar, Karnataka. He died from respiratory and kidney failure in Kolar, on 17 December 2021, at the age of 96.

References

External links
 Home Page on the Parliament of India's Website
 Biographical Sketch at indiapress.org

1925 births
2021 deaths
Indian National Congress politicians from Karnataka
India MPs 2004–2009
People from Kolar
India MPs 1996–1997
India MPs 1998–1999
India MPs 1999–2004
Lok Sabha members from Karnataka
People from Chikkaballapur
Janata Dal politicians